Annaheim is a village in the Canadian province of Saskatchewan within the Rural Municipality of St. Peter No. 369 and Census Division No. 15. The village is located about 125 km east of the City of Saskatoon, at the junction of provincial Highway 756 and Highway 779. Annaheim hosts the offices of the Rural Municipality of St. Peter No. 369.

History 
Annaheim incorporated as a village on April 1, 1977. Annaheim means Anna's home (Anna's heim) in German.

Demographics 

Economy 
Annaheim is the headquarters of Doepker Industries, a semi trailer and heavy machinery manufacturer, which is also the community's main employer.

Attractions 
The village has a Roman Catholic church (St. Ann's Parish), a community hall, skating rink, credit union, post office, New Horizons recreation and senior centre (including a bowling alley) and a bar.

Education 
The school in Annaheim contains approximately 100 students, from kindergarten to grade 12. In September of 2021, Annaheim got a new class, the Pre-K class. There are still fewer than 100 students.

See also

 List of communities in Saskatchewan
 List of villages in Saskatchewan

References

External links
 Municipal Directory Saskatchewan - Village of Annaheim
 Photos of Annaheim

Villages in Saskatchewan
St. Peter No. 369, Saskatchewan
Division No. 15, Saskatchewan